The Mumbai Metro is a rapid transit (MRT) system serving the city of Mumbai and the wider Mumbai Metropolitan Region in Maharashtra, India. Mumbai Metropolitan Region Development Authority is the responsible authority for maintaining the metro system. Maha Metro is responsible for all the metro rail projects undergoing in Maharashtra except the Mumbai Metropolitan Area. The system is designed to reduce traffic congestion in the city, and supplement the overcrowded Mumbai Suburban Railway network. It is being built in three phases over a 15-year period, with overall completion expected in October 2026.

Line 1 of the Mumbai Metro Line 1 is operated by Mumbai Metro One Private Limited (MMOPL), a joint venture between Reliance Infrastructure (69%), Mumbai Metropolitan Region Development Authority, (26%) and RATP Dev Transdev Asia, France (5%). While lines 2, 4, 6, 7 (under construction), 5 and their extensions (bidding in progress) will be built by the Mumbai Metropolitan Region Development Authority (MMRDA), the completely underground Line 3 (also under construction) will be built by Mumbai Metro Railway Corporation Limited (MMRCL). In another boost to connectivity, the Mumbai Metropolitan Region Development Authority (MMRDA) has decided to connect Mumbai and Virar with a Metro line.

In June 2006, Prime Minister Manmohan Singh laid the foundation stone for the first phase of the Mumbai Metro project, although construction work began in February 2008. A successful trial run was conducted in May 2013, and the system's first line entered into operation on 8 June 2014. Many metro projects were being delayed because of late environmental clearances, land acquisition troubles and protests.

The financial capital of India received its first Metro in June 2014, and nearly after 8 years, Mumbai welcomed its two new metro corridors 2A and 7, which are now partially operational. Chief Minister Uddhav Thackeray flagged off the new metro lines 2A and 7 on 2 April 2022. The line was opened for commercial operation on the same day of the inauguration in the evening from 8 PM onwards. As a part of the Phase 1 plan, both metro corridors cover a  route (Dahanukarwadi–Dahisar–Aarey). The Metro runs between Dahanukarwadi on Metro Line 2A and Aarey on Line 7.

History
Mumbai is the capital of Maharashtra. It is among the largest cities in the world, with a total metropolitan area population of over 2 crore (20 million) as of 2011, and a population growth rate of around 2% per annum. Mumbai has the advantage of a high modal share of the public (88%) in favour of a public mass transport system. The existing Mumbai Suburban Railway carries over 70 lakh (7 million) passengers per day, and is supplemented by the Brihanmumbai Electric Supply and Transport (BEST) bus system, which provides feeder services to station-going passengers to allow them to complete their journeys. Until 1980s, transport in Mumbai was not a big problem. The discontinuation of trams resulted in a direct increase of passenger pressure on the suburban railway network. By 2010 the population of Mumbai doubled. However, due to the city's geographical constraints and rapid population growth, road and rail infrastructure development has not been able to keep pace with growing demand over the last 4-5 decades. Moreover, the Mumbai Suburban Railway, though extensive, is not built to rapid transit specifications.

The Mumbai Metro was proposed to be built in three phases, at an estimated cost of 19,525 crore. In September 2009, the proposed Hutatma Chowk – Ghatkopar was reduced to a line between Hutatma Chowk and Carnac Bunder.

In 2011, the MMRDA unveiled plans for an extended Colaba-Bandra-SEEPZ metro line. However, the MMRDA decided to increase ridership on the line by running it out past Bandra to Chhatrapati Shivaji Maharaj International Airport. It will have 27 stations.On 27 February 2012, the Union Government gave in-principle approval to the plan for Line 3. Money for the project is being borrowed from Japanese International Cooperation Agency (50%), the state government (16%), the central government (14%), and others. In April 2012, the MMRDA announced plans to grant the Mumbai Metro Rail Company increased management autonomy, in an effort to enhance the project's operational efficiency. In July 2012, the MMRDA announced plans to add more metro lines to its existing plan, including a line parallel to the Western Express Highway from Bandra to Dahisar. This line is expected to reduce the passenger load on the Western Line and vehicle traffic on the highway. The MMRDA also intends to convert the proposed Lokhandwala–SEEPZ–Kanjurmarg monorail route into a metro line.

In June 2015, two new lines were proposed. A line from Andheri West to Dahisar West, and a line from BKC to Mankhurd. The following table shows the updated master plan unveiled by the MMRDA: 

On 18 February 2013, the MMRDA signed a memorandum of understanding with Transport for London, the transit authority in Greater London. The arrangement will facilitate the exchange of information, personnel and technology in the transportation sector.

The revised Mumbai Metro master plan had proposed a line along the Thane-Teen Haath Naka-Kaapurbavdi-Ghodbunder Road route. The feasibility report concluded that the line was not feasible as most residents of Thane and its neighbouring areas travelled to Mumbai for work daily. On 14 June 2014, Chavan announced that the MMRDA was instead examining a proposal for a metro line along the new proposed route of Wadala-Ghatkopar-Teen Haat Naka route. RITES will prepare the detailed project report and is expected to submit it by August 2014. The preliminary report proposed a  line with 29 stations, to be built at an estimated cost of 22,000 crore. This would be the fourth line of the metro, after the previously proposed Charkop-Dahisar route was merged with the Charkop-Bandra-Mankhurd route to form Line 2.

Following the opening of Line 1, MMRDA metropolitan commissioner UPS Madan stated that the authority would focus on constructing the Colaba-Bandra-SEEPZ, Dahisar-Bandra-Mankhurd, and Wadala-Thane-Kasarvadavali lines. He also stated that the other proposed lines had not been cancelled and that they may be implemented in the future. In May 2015, the MMRDA stated that it had begun planning for the Andheri-Dahisar line and Seepz-Kanjurmarg. Both lines are expected to be elevated, although the latter could be constructed underground if a proposal to extend Line 3 to Kanjurmarg is undertaken. DPRs for both lines had been prepared in 2004, along with the master plan, and the MMRDA would now update the DPRs. The agency also intends to construct Line 9 of the metro as an underground corridor from Sewri to Worli. However, planning for the project will only begun after the construction of the proposed Mumbai Trans Harbour Link commences.

In a report on 14 November 2014 about the cancellation of the PPP agreement for Line 2, Mint quoted a senior MMRDA official as stating, "as decided earlier, all future lines of Mumbai Metro will be constructed by the Mumbai Metro Railway Corp. Ltd (MMRCL), a joint venture between the state government and the Union government." On 20 May 2015, Chief Minister Devendra Fadnavis requested officials to consider constructing the Charkop-Bandra-Dahisar and the Wadala-Thane-Kasarvadavali lines as elevated corridors. Although, both corridors had been planned as elevated lines in the Mumbai Metro master plan, the previous Congress-NCP had decided to construct all metro lines underground, after delays and difficulties caused by acquiring land for Line 1. However, Fadnavis believes that the two proposed lines can be constructed quicker and cheaper if they were elevated due to the proposed route of the alignment. The Government plans to implement all future metro lines (except Line 3) as elevated corridors. On 15 June 2015, the MMRDA announced that it would implement Line 2 of the metro in three parts. The Andheri-Dahisar line will have connectivity with the existing Line 1 and the proposed JVLR-Kanjurmarg line.

In June 2015, Fadnavis announced that he would request the Delhi Metro Rail Corporation (DMRC) to assist in the implementation of the Mumbai Metro. He stated that he intends to expand the metro system by  before the state assembly elections in October 2019. In July 2015, UPS Madan announced that the State Government formally appointed the DMRC to revise and update the Mumbai Metro master plan. The DMRC will prepare DPRs for the Andheri East to Dahisar East, Jogeshwari to Kanjurmarg, Andheri West to Dahisar West and Bandra Kurla Complex to Mankhurd lines. The Andheri-Dahisar line will have connectivity with the existing Line 1 and the proposed JVLR-Kanjurmarg line. All four lines are proposed to be elevated and constructed as cash contracts. In addition, the planned Line 3 and Wadala-Ghatkopar-Thane-Kasarvadavli line of the metro would also be constructed.

Fadnavis announced on 8 April 2017 that the government was considering a circular metro loop line along the Kalyan-Dombivli-Taloja route. The proposed  line would link Kalyan and Shil Phata with 13 stations, bring metro connectivity to Kalyan East, Dombivli, Ambernath and Diva.

The Mumbai Metro resumed services for general public on 19 October 2020, after being shut down since March 2020 due to the COVID-19 pandemic.

Network

Lines on the Mumbai Metro are currently identified by numbers. In March 2016, MMRDA Metropolitan Commissioner, U.P.S. Madan, announced that all lines on the system would be color-coded after more lines are opened.

Operational Lines

Future Lines 
{{legend|#bfffba|UC → Under construction }}

§ Numbers in italics denote data that is estimated
‡ Lines labeled APR are either in DPR stage, or have not yet entered the planning stage, while those labelled Planned are awaiting clearances to enter the tendering stage
† E=Elevated 
†† UG=Underground 
§§§ Extrapolated from weekday daily ridership numbers reported for the last reported fiscal

Lines

It is fully elevated, and consists of 12 stations. Work on the Versova-Andheri-Ghatkopar corridor, a part of Phase I, began on 8 February 2008. A crucial bridge on the project was completed at the end of 2012. The line opened for service on 8 June 2014.

This corridor is being executed in two phases i.e. 2A and 2B.

The corridor has 17 stations (Dahisar (West) to D N Nagar), and is expected to cost .

Its civil works, including viaduct and stations, are being executed by J.Kumar Infra-CRTG JV. The corridor is partially operational since April 2, 2022 and fully operational since January 19, 2023.

This section will have 22 stations (D N Nagar to Mandale), work on which began in mid 2018.

Its civil works, including viaduct and stations, is being executed by Simplex Infrastructure, RCC-MBZ JV and Neeraj-Guam JV.

2A

Expected Cost: ₹6,410 crore

Expected Daily Ridership: 9 Lakh (900,000)

2B

Expected Cost: ₹10,986 crore

Expected Daily Ridership: 10.5 Lakh (1,050,000)

Rolling Stock: BEML

The metro line will connect the Cuffe Parade business district in the south of Mumbai with SEEPZ and Aarey in the north.

The original deadline for the project was 2016, but it is currently expected to be completed only by Dec 2023 due to Covid delays.

Upon completion, it will have interchanges with the planned Line 6 at SEEPZ, Line 1 at Marol Naka, Line 2 at BKC, Central Line at Chhatrapati Shivaji Terminus, Mumbai Monorail at Mahalaxmi (Jacob Circle), and Western Line at Mahalaxmi, Mumbai Central and Churchgate.

57% of the funds needed for this project are being sourced as multilateral debt from JICA.

Expected Cost: ₹23,136 crore

Expected Daily Ridership: 17 Lakh (1,700,000)

Rolling Stock: Alstom

It is estimated to cost . This project will help connect the city of Thane with Mumbai with an alternate mode of public transport.

The line was approved by the Maharashtra Government on 27 September 2016, and construction work on this line began in mid 2018.

The construction of viaducts and stations is being executed by consortium of Reliance-Astaldi JV and Tata Projects-CHEC JV.

It is expected to get completed by 2025.

Expected Cost: ₹15,498 crore

Expected Daily Ridership: 13.4 Lakh (1,340,000)

The -long Thane-Bhiwandi-Kalyan Metro-V corridor will have 17 stations and will cost ₹8,416 crore. It will be an elevated corridor. It will connect Thane to Bhiwandi and Kalyan in the eastern suburbs, with further extension to Taloja in Navi Mumbai that is line 12.

The stations include Kapurbawdi in Thane (West), Balkum Naka, Kasheli, Kalher, Purna, Anjur Phata, Dhamankar Naka, Bhiwandi, Gopal Nagar, Temghar, Rajnouli Village, Govegaon MIDC, Kongaon, Durgadi Fort, Sahajanand Chowk, Kalyan railway station and Kalyan APMC.

The line was approved by Chief Minister Devendra Fadnavis on 19 October 2016.The 12.811 km Thane – Bhiwandi section is under construction. Bhiwandi – Kalyan is on-hold (route modification in progress)..The corridor is being constructucted by Afcons in one package from Kalyan to Bhiwandi including 7 stations.

Expected Cost: ₹8,417 crore

Expected Daily Ridership: 3 Lakh (300,000)

It will be an elevated corridor. It will connect Lokhandwala Complex in Andheri in the western suburbs to Vikhroli and Kanjurmarg in the eastern suburbs.

The stations include Lokhandwala Complex, Adarsh Nagar, Momin Nagar, JVLR, Shyam Nagar, Mahakali Caves, SEEPZ Village, Saki Vihar Road, Ram Baug, Powai Lake, IIT Powai, Kanjurmarg (W), Vikhroli-Eastern Express Highway.

Metro 6 will provide interchange with Metro 2 at Infinity Mall in Andheri, with Metro 3 at SEEPZ, with Metro 4 and the Mumbai Suburban Railway at Jogeshwari and Kanjurmarg, and with Metro 7 at JVLR.

The line was approved by Chief Minister Devendra Fadnavis on 19 October 2016. The MMRDA issued a tender to conduct a detailed aerial mapping survey of the alignment in April 2017. Authorities will also be able to determine the location of trees along the alignment accuracy of up to 10 cm utilizing a differential GPS (DGPS), while a digital aerial triangulation system will help determine the types of trees, their heights and diameters.

Line-6’s first section is expected to open in 2025.

The construction of viaduct and station work is being executed by J Kumar Infraprojects and MBZ-EIIL JV.

Expected Cost: ₹6,672 crore

Expected Daily Ridership: 7.2 Lakh (720,000)

The line is partially elevated (under construction, with completion slated for 2019), and partially underground (approved, with construction planned to begin in 2018).

Civil works, including viaduct and station works, is being executed by NCC, Simplex Infrastructure, and J. Kumar Infraprojects. The corridor is partially operational since April 2, 2022 and fully operational since January 19, 2023.

Expected Cost: ₹6,208 crore

Expected Daily Ridership: 6.7 Lakh (670,000)

Rolling stock: BEML

This is a proposed metro line between the Chhatrapati Shivaji Maharaj International Airport and the under construction Navi Mumbai International Airport. It will connect Mumbai airport to upcoming Navi Mumbai airport
• and its length would be approx 32 km.

Expected Cost: ₹15,000 crore approx.

Expected time of completion: October 2026

Expected Daily Ridership: 3 Lakh (300,000)

Extension of Line 7 (Red Line)
Metro line 9 will ply between Dahisar-Mira Bhayander route. It will have 10 stations all elevated. This Under Construction Metro of Dahisar to Mira-Bhayandar will cut down approximately 30 km of travel distance between the Mira-Bhayandar and Mumbai suburbs. It is an extension of Line 7.

Expected time of completion: 2024

Expected Daily Ridership: 4.4 Lakh (440,000)

Rolling stock: BEML

Extension of Line 4 (Green Line)
In February 2017, the MMRDA announced that the DMRC was preparing a detailed project report (DPR) on Metro 10, a proposed  elevated extension of Metro 4 from Gaimukh to Shivaji Chowk.

The project is estimated to cost  with an estimated ridership of 2.5 lakh (250,000). It will be completed by 2025.

Extension of Line 4 (Green Line)
In November 2018, the MMRDA cleared the Metro 11, which connects Wadala with CSMT. This would be considered to be an extension to Metro 4. The line will be partially underground, with 8 underground and 2 elevated stations. It will be completed by October 2026.

Extension of Line 5 (Orange Line)
MMRDA has planned the Metro 12, which will connect Kalyan with Taloja. It is an extension of line 5. In another boost to connectivity, the Mumbai Metropolitan Region Development Authority (MMRDA) has decided to connect Mumbai, Thane and Navi Mumbai with a Metro line. The estimated cost of the project is ₹5,865 crore and construction began in August 2020. It will be completed by October 2024.

It is a proposed metro project to connect Mira Road with Virar. 
The project length is 23 km and the estimated cost of the project is ₹6,900 crore. 
 
The DPR is created for this route This line will be operational by October 2026.

 
It is an approved metro project to connect Vikhroli with Kanjurmarg and further to Ambernath-Badlapur.
It will have an intersection at Kanjurmarg with Line 6, the Pink Line.
This project is now at the DPR stage. 
It will be completed by October 2026.

Rolling stock
Reliance Infrastructure consulted a number of major international rolling stock builders to provide the train fleet for the Mumbai Metro. Bidders for the contract included established metro-vehicle manufacturers such as Kawasaki, Alstom, Siemens and Bombardier, but CRRC Nanjing Puzhen of China was ultimately chosen to supply rolling stock for ₹600 crore. In May 2008, CSR Nanjing completed the first 16 trains, each comprising four cars. The first ten trains were reported to be ready for operation in January 2013.

The coaches are fire retardant, air-conditioned and designed to reduce noise and vibration, and will feature both high seating capacity and ample space for standing passengers. They will be outfitted with a number of features for safety and convenience, including LCD screens, 3D route maps, first-aid kits, wheelchair facilities, fire-fighting equipment and intercom systems permitting communication with the train driver. Each coach will furthermore feature a black box to assist in accident investigations.

In 2018, the Mumbai Metro Rail Corporation chose Alstom to supply 31 eight car trains for Aqua line (line 3). The trains will be capable of driverless operations and will be built at Alstom's factory in Sri City, Andhra Pradesh.

In 2018, Mumbai Metropolitan Region Development Authority which will operate all metro lines except Line 3, awarded a tender to Bharat Earth Movers Ltd. (BEML) to supply 63 trainsets (378 coaches) for Yellow Line (Line 2) and Red Line (Line 7) at a cost of ₹3,015 crores ($427.33 million). Capable of driverless operations, the trains are manufactured at BEML's factory in Bengaluru and first rake For Yellow Line arrived in Mumbai on 27 January 2021, and will continue to receive the rest of the rakes till 2022. Recently on 17 January 2021, Bombardier won the tender to supply 234 driverless coaches for Green Line (Line 4) of six-car configuration for Mumbai metro. However, the contract has been cancelled in March 2022 due to delays and uncertainties of the project.

Power supply
Unlike 97% of metro corridors worldwide which run on direct current (DC), the Mumbai Metro runs on alternating current (AC) which is more labour and cost-intensive. MMRDA joint project director Dilip Kawathkar stated that AC power was chosen "after a proper study by a team of experts''" which found that the AC model was "a better option". Bidders for Line 3 were reportedly in favour of the DC model. Experts believe that the decision to use AC will escalate the project cost of underground lines by 15%, since more digging is required for the rail to work on AC.

Signalling and communications
The Mumbai Metro will feature an advanced signalling system, including an automatic train protection system (ATPS) and automated signalling to control train movements on the  Line 1. A four-minute service interval is anticipated on the route.

Siemens will supply the signalling systems required for the project, while Thales Group will supply the Metro's communication systems. The network's signalling and train control systems will be based on LZB 700M technology.

Ridership
On 21 October 2019, exactly after 1,960 days (approx. 5 years) of Mumbai Metro Line 1's inception, the system crossed 60 crore passengers, with an average daily ridership of around 4,50,000 (4.5 lakh) passengers.

Network map

See also
Urban rail transit in India
Navi Mumbai Metro
Pune Metro
Nagpur Metro
Thane Metro
List of rapid transit systems
Public transport in Mumbai
Mumbai Monorail
M-Indicator

References

External links

Mumbai Metro Rail Project - MMRDA site
Mumbai Metro blog site
Mumbai Metro unofficial magazine
Mumbai Metro unofficial Information Site

 
Transport in Mumbai
Underground rapid transit in India
Standard gauge railways in India
25 kV AC railway electrification
2014 establishments in Maharashtra
Railway lines opened in 2014